Xining Prison is a prison in Xining, Qinghai province. It is assigned one of the 12 largest Laogai mines in Northwestern China. It is connected to a prison firm, Qinghaihu Hand Tools Limited Liability Company.

See also
List of prisons in Qinghai

References

Prisons in China
1965 establishments in China
Buildings and structures in Qinghai